Pig Heaven/Slaughter the Grey is the second EP by White Zombie, independently released as an EP in May 1986. Two different pressings of this album were created (the differences between the two being the different guitarists and the altered cover art), both of which were limited to 500 copies each. By this time drummer Peter Landau was replaced by Ivan de Prume, who would remain with the band until Astro-Creep: 2000, and guitarist Paul "Ena" Kostabi by Tim Jeffs.

Recording
Although only "Pig Heaven" and "Slaughter the Grey" were released, the band also recorded "Scarecrow #2 (a remake of "Tales From The Scarecrow Man" from Gods on Voodoo Moon)", "Rain Insane", "Paradise Fireball", and "Red River Flow" in the same session. These songs were officially released on It Came From NYC. A bulk of the material was recorded in roughly two hours.

Track listing

Personnel
Adapted from the Pig Heaven/Slaughter the Grey liner notes.

White Zombie
 Ivan de Prume – drums
 Tim Jeffs – electric guitar
 Rob Zombie (as Rob Straker) – vocals, cover art, illustrations
 Sean Yseult – bass, photography

Additional musicians and production
 J.Z. Barrell – engineering
 Alex Smith – photography
 White Zombie – production

Release history

References

External links 
 

White Zombie (band) albums
1986 EPs